Risk is a 2001 Australian film about insurance fraud directed by Alan White and starring Tom Long, Bryan Brown, and Claudia Karvan. The film is based on the story The Adjuster by Tracy Kidder.

Plot synopsis
John Kriesky (Bryan Brown) is a veteran insurance investigator who is tempted towards the wrong side of the law. With the help of an amateur con man Ben (Tom Long), John hatches a scheme to substantiate false claims by taking part of several questionable claims his firm has settled for a fraction of what they're usually worth. John and Ben get help in their illegal business by a lawyer named Louise (Claudia Karvan) has an addiction cocaine problem and is also John's lover. But when Louise becomes involved with Ben and demands a bigger cut of the money, their already-shaky confidence game begins to fall apart.

Cast
Tom Long as Ben Madigan
Claudia Karvan as Louise Roncoli
Melissa Madden Gray as Colleen
Bryan Brown as John Kriesky
Jason Clarke as Chris
Sharin Contini as Mrs. Whelan
Thomas Clunie as Mr. Whelan
Brian Meegan as Instructor

Reception
Risk was met with positive reviews from critics and audiences, earning an 80% approval rating on Rotten Tomatoes.

Scott Weinberg of Apollo Guide gave a positive reviews, commenting "Risk may not be the most unique crime drama to come down the pike, but it's certainly intriguing and polished enough to earn a look."

Jason Gorber of Film Scouts gave a negative review, calling it "a straight ahead, uneventful movie. Boring in parts, the film tries to work as a slick Indie feature but seems like a tired Hollywood film."

Accolades
Bryan Brown was nominated for Best Supporting Actor at the FCCA Awards.

References

External links

Risk at Urban Cinefile
Risk at Oz Movies

Australian crime thriller films
2000s English-language films
2001 films
2000s Australian films